Beegle is a surname. Notable people with the surname include:

 May Beegle (1882–1943), American publicist, concert promoter, and agent
 Raymond Beegle (born 1942), American musician

Americanized surnames
German-language surnames